Hainich National Park, founded on December 31, 1997, is the 13th national park in Germany and the only one in Thuringia. One of the main objectives of the park is the protection of an ancient native beech forest. In 2011, the park was added to the Ancient and Primeval Beech Forests of the Carpathians and Other Regions of Europe World Heritage Site because of its testimony to the ecological history of the beech tree and the dynamics of forests in Europe since the Last Glacial Period.

Geography 

The  park lies in the western part of the German state of Thuringia, east of the Werra River, and is part of the greater Eichsfeld-Hainich-Werratal Nature Park. It occupies much of the triangular area between the cities of Eisenach, Mühlhausen, and Bad Langensalza. The national park the southern part of the roughly  Hainich, the largest contiguous deciduous forest in Germany.

Flora and fauna 

The Hainich Forest features a wide range of beech forest communities, with populations of ash trees, hornbeams, maples, lindens, and occasional checker trees. Many fungi can be found there, along with stands of flowers such as summer snowflakes and anemones. Animals in the park include wildcats, 15 species of bats, 7 species of woodpeckers, and over 500 types of wood beetles.

Protection of the ecosystem 

The goal of Hainich National Park is to restore a large section of central European forest to its primordial state. In the future, the beech forest should grow to cover most of the park's area.

Photo gallery

See also 
 Alte Burg, an ancient castle site within the park.

Literature 
 Hainich Artenbuch – Tiere, Pflanzen und Pilze im Nationalpark Hainich, Verlag Rockstuhl, Bad Langensalza, 2005,

Films 
 Nationalpark Hainich: ein Urwald in der Mitte Deutschlands. Documentary, 30 Min., Germany, 1999, by Peter and Stefan Simank, Production: Simank-Filmproduktion, Dresden. Summary by Mitteldeutscher Rundfunk

External links 

 Thüringer Gesetz über den Nationalpark Hainich vom 19. Dezember 1997
 Official Website (English pages)
 Information about the Hainich on the Website of the Nationalen Naturlandschaften (in German)

References 

National parks of Germany
Protected areas of Thuringia
Protected areas established in 1997
1997 establishments in Germany
Primeval Beech Forests in Europe
IUCN Category II
Tourist attractions in Thuringia
Central European mixed forests